Bollsta IK is a sports club in Bollstabruk, Sweden, established in 1912.

The women's soccer team played in the Swedish top division in 1978 and 1979.

References

External links
Bollsta IK 

Football clubs in Västernorrland County
Ski clubs in Sweden
Sports clubs established in 1912
1912 establishments in Sweden